Marine Scientific Research Institute of radioelectronics or MNIIRE Altair design bureau is a Soviet/Russian enterprise, developer of naval SA missile systems and radars. Headquartered in Moscow.

History
Founded in 1933 as the All-Union State Institute of Telemechanics and Communication for the development of new weapon types for the Red Army and the Red Navy.

In 1940 the institute was granted the Lenin Prize for the development of Rif, Zarnitsa and Angara radars for the small ships, torpedo boats and minesweepers

In 1984 received the second Lenin Prize for the development of multi-channel SAM systems like Shtil, Rif and Klinok that allowed to combat the anti-ship missiles.

In 2010 Altair became a subsidiary of NPO Almaz, as the company's Science & Technical Center. Altair ceased to exist as a separate legal entity during the same year.

Products
Major developments:
 S-300F (SA-N-6 "Grumble"), naval SAM system
 Uragan/Shtil (SA-N-7 "Gadfly"), naval multirole SAM system
 Kinzhal/Klinok (SA-N-9 "Gauntlet"), naval SAM system
 Gibka, the ship turret launcher 3M-47 
 Podzagolovok-23, Basic Collective Mutual Interference Avoidance System

References

External links 
  Official site of Altair
  Official site of Altair (old site)

1933 establishments in Russia
Defence companies of the Soviet Union
Defence companies of Russia
Research institutes in the Soviet Union
Science and technology in Russia
Almaz-Antey
Manufacturing companies established in 1933
Electronics companies established in 1933
Companies based in Moscow
Electronics companies of the Soviet Union